Pakistan's current Taxation system is defined by Income Tax Ordinance 2001 (for direct taxes) and Sales Tax Act 1990 (for indirect taxes) and administrated by Federal Board of Revenue (FBR).

History

The Income Tax Act of 1922
The Income Tax Act of 1922 was prevalent during the British Raj and was inherited by both the governments of India and Pakistan upon independence and partition in 1947. This act initially formed the basis of both countries' Income Tax codes.

The Income Tax Ordinance (1979)
The Income Tax Ordinance was the first law on Income Tax which was promulgated in Pakistan from 28 June 1979 by the Government of Pakistan.

The Income Tax Ordinance, 2001
To update the tax laws and bring the country's tax laws into line with international standards, the Income Tax Ordinance 2001 was promulgated on 13 September 2001. It became effective from 1 July 2002.

IT rules 2002
IT (Income Tax) rules 2002 were promulgated by the Federal Board of Revenue (FBR) on 1 July 2002 in exercise its powers granted under section 237 of the
Ordinance.

Problems
Taxation in Pakistan is a complex system of more than 70 unique taxes administered by at least 37 agencies of the Government of Pakistan. According to the FBR, in 2021, the number of registered tax filers had grown to 7.1 million out of which only 2.5 million were active tax filers.

The FBR has surpassed its collection target by RS 247 billion from July to March of current fiscal year 21-22, which represents increase by 29.1% over the collection of rupees 3,394 billion during the same period last year. On the other hand, gross collections also increased by 28.9%.

Direct taxes / Income Taxes
Federal income taxes are administered by the Federal Board of Revenue. The period from July 1 to June 30 is considered as a normal tax year for Pakistan tax law purposes.

Corporate Income tax rates
Currently, the Corporate Income tax rate is 29% for tax year 2019 and onwards whereas the corporate tax rate is 35% for Banking Industry for TY 2019.

In addition to Corporate Tax, there are other applicable income taxes including Super Tax, Minimum Tax, and Tax on Undistributed reserves.

Generally, manufacturing business is taxable at Corporate Tax rate whereas trading business and commercial imports business is taxable as "minimum tax". For example, 5.5% withholding income tax is applicable on commercial imports and is payable at the import stage. This 5.5% withholding tax will be considered as minimum tax and Corporate Tax is also applicable, whichever is higher will be the tax liability, on this business. Now Pakistani taxpayers individuals or businesses can use online income tax returns filing websites like TAXApp  to submit their returns easily and securely.

POS Integration Of TIER-1 Retailers With FBR Real-Time Sales Reporting System

According to new Tax Laws (SRO-1006) all tier-1 retailers are required to integrate their POSs with FBR’s real time invoicing system in Pakistan. It is also mandatory for all restaurants to integrate their POSs. These FBR Invoicing system and FBR Integrated POS systems should be able to handle sales, returns and exchanges. Around 11,744 POS terminals have been integrated with the real-time reporting system by July 31, the FBR has announced.

For speeding up the process, the FBR on Aug 9 through SRO1005 (I)/2001 announced a prize scheme to encourage tier-1 retailers to get themselves integrated with the real-time sales reporting system. Many medium- and small-sized tier-1 retailers of various types have yet to integrate their point-of-sale (POS) with the Federal Board of Revenue (FBR) for real-time reporting of sales.To facilitate these Tier 1 retailers in Pakistan with integration and installation of such POS systems Tier3 has launched FBR POS Integration Software – FBR POS. A specialised advance Inventory management and POS system is specially developed for retailers in Pakistan keeping in focus the info security and integrity of data and processes involved.

Indirect taxes
Indirect tax or more commonly knows as sales tax is also applicable on supply of goods and provision of services. Under the 18th amendment to the Constitution of Pakistan, the right to charge sales tax on services has been given to the provincial governments where as the right to charge sales tax on goods has been given to the federal government. Consequently, provincial revenue authorities were created to manage and collect provincial sales tax in their respective provinces.

Below is a summary of the applicable sales tax rates in Pakistan:

 Sales tax on goods: 18%
 Sindh Sales tax on services: 13%
 Punjab Sales tax on services: 16%
 Balouchistan Sales tax on services: 15%
 Khyber Pakhtunkhwa (KPK) Sales tax on services: 15%
 Islamabad Capital Territory (Tax on Services): 16%

Year Wise Tax Collection in Pakistan

Corruption

According to a 2002 study, 99% of 256 respondents reported facing corruption with regard to taxation. Furthermore, 32% of respondents reported paying bribes to have their tax assessment lowered, and nearly 14% reported receiving fictitious tax assessments until a bribe was paid.

Further reading 
 Bahl, R., Wallace, S., & Cyan, M. (2008). Pakistan: Provincial government taxation (No. paper0807). International Center for Public Policy, Andrew Young School of Policy Studies, Georgia State University.

References

 
 Best Sales & Income tax consultant in Pakistan